Pseudophoxinus mehmeti is a species of cyprinid in the genus Pseudophoxinus.

References

Cyprinid fish of Asia
Taxa named by Davut Turan
Taxa named by Fitnat Güler Ekmekçi
Fish of Turkey
Fish described in 2015